Acta Neurologica Belgica is a quarterly peer-reviewed medical journal covering neurology. It was established in 1901 and is published by Springer Science+Business Media. It is an official journal of a number of Belgian medical societies (Belgian Neurological Society, Belgian Society for Neuroscience, Belgian Society of Clinical Neurophysiology, Belgian Pediatric Neurology Society, Belgian Study Group of Multiple Sclerosis, Belgian Stroke Council, Belgian Headache Society, Belgian Study Group of Neuropathology). The editor-in-chief is Michel Van Zandijcke (Ghent University).

Abstracting and indexing 
The journal is abstracted and indexed in:

According to the Journal Citation Reports, the journal has a 2020 impact factor of 2.396.

References

External links 
 
Publisher Springer

Quarterly journals
Neurology journals
Springer Science+Business Media academic journals
Publications established in 1901
English-language journals